Chih-Kung Lee (C.K. Lee; ; born October 1959 in Taipei) is a Taiwanese mechanical engineer. He received his B.S. degree in civil engineering from National Taiwan University and then obtained his M.S. and Ph.D. degrees from Cornell University, majoring in theoretical & applied mechanics, with a minor in physics. He is known as the inventor of modal sensors and actuators. In the past, he has been an advisor to the Ministry of Education, Ministry of Economic Affairs and various other governmental agencies, as well as the director general of engineering & applied sciences at Taiwan's National Science Council (NSC). Currently, he is the chairman of Industrial Technology Research Institute (ITRI) and Institute for Information Industry (III). He is also a distinguished professor of the Graduate Institute of Electronics Engineering, the Institute of Applied Mechanics (IAM) and the Dept. of Engineering Science & Ocean Engineering at National Taiwan University.

Personal background
Lee received his B.S. degree in civil engineering from National Taiwan University in 1981. After serving his two years mandatory military service in Taiwan's Air Force, he continued his graduate studies with a fellowship at Cornell University in New York, where he received a M.S. and Ph.D., majoring in theoretical & applied mechanics, with a minor in physics. During his PhD studies at Cornell, he developed piezoelectric modal sensors and actuators.  This innovation was important in the control of flexible structures as it resolved modal spillover.

In 1987, Lee joined IBM's Almaden Research Center in San Jose, California, as a research staff member and later as a staff to the IBM ARC Laboratory Director. His research work at IBM was primarily on the interdisciplinary areas related to magnetic disk drives, optoelectronic systems, metrology systems and piezoelectric systems. He was awarded an IBM Outstanding Technical Achievement Award for his work on reducing the thermal track mis-registration of the 3.5 inch, 320 MByte, IBM 0661 hard disk file, a highly profitable commercial product at that time. He received two distinguished Invention Awards for his inventions and patents on laser encoders, nanometer fly height measurement systems, piezoelectric strain rate gages, and acceleration rate sensors for early shock arrival.

His younger brother is Howard Lee.

Research interests
In 1994, he joined the faculty of National Taiwan University’s Institute of Applied Mechanics where he co-founded the Nano-Bio-MEMS research group. He is a well-recognized expert in the areas of flexible structure control, shock sensing, and sensor development due to his research work on distributed piezoelectric sensors and actuators. He has directed many research projects in the areas of ultra-high performance laser Doppler interferometers, laser encoders, sphere ellipsometry analyzers, curved distributed piezoelectric sensors/actuators, dot matrix writers, diffractive optical elements/systems, and laser writers. His specialty lies in systems integration which combines mechanics, optics, electronics, semiconductors, mechanisms, metrology, and interface systems to create new innovative systems. He has many research papers in various fields and has over 110 patents, including various technology transfers to industry. He has teamed up with other departments and research teams at other Universities, to focus on topics in medical care, chemical research, electronic engineering and biotechnology. Some results of their research efforts include the Sparkle holographic mastering system, AVID interferometer/vibrometer, an ellipsometer, an ultrasonic sensor with anisotropic beam pattern, SARS No. 1 antivirus compound, a flexible electret speaker, etc., all of which have been technology transferred to industry. The AVID interferometer/vibrometer won Photonic Spectra's Circle of Excellence Award in 1998 for one of the top 25 optoelectronic systems worldwide, the first time a Taiwan company won the award.

Specialties
Optoelectronic and Piezoelectric Systems, MEMS & Nano-Systems, Optoelectronic Systems Design, Precision Metrology, Automation Technology, Biochip Systems, Technology Management.

Careers
Chairman, Industrial Technology Research Institute, Taiwan (2017/10~)
Distinguished Professor, Graduate Institute of Electronics Engineering, National Taiwan University (2016/08~)
Distinguished Professor, Institute of Applied Mechanics, National Taiwan University (2007/08~)
Distinguished Professor, Department of Engineering Science and Ocean Engineering, National Taiwan University (2007/08~)
Advisor, Ministry of Education, Taiwan (2002/01~2004/07, 2010/10~)
Consultant, Taiwan Intellectual Property Training Academy	(2007/01~)
Taiwan Member of the Board, Pan Wen Yuan Foundation (2007/09~)
President, Institute for Information Industry, Taiwan (2010/08~2012/09)
Executive Vice-President, Industrial Technology Research Institute, Taiwan (2007/10~2010/07)
Director General, Industrial Economics & Knowledge Center (IEK), Institute for Information Industry, Taiwan (2009/05~2009/10)
Director General, Information and Communications Research Laboratories (ICL), Institute for Information Industry, Taiwan (2009/09~2009/12)
Director General, Department of Engineering and Applied Science, National Science Council (2004/08~2007/07)
Researcher, National Applied Research Laboratories, Taiwan (2004/03~2007/09)
Managing Supervisor, Photonics Industry & Technology Development Association, Taiwan (2006/04~2007/07)
Director, Biomedical Research and Development, Hsinchu Biomedical Science Park, National Taiwan University (2003/10~2006/08)
Committee Member, Commission on Research and Development, National Taiwan University (2002/08~2005/07)
Director, Division of Strategic Planning, Office of Research and Development, National Taiwan University (2002/02~2004/07)
Program Director, MEMS & Nanotechnology Engineering Advancement Program, National Science Council, Taiwan Program Director MEMS Program, National Science Council, Taiwan (1999/03~2001/04)
Director, NDT&M Lab, Tjing Ling Industrial Research Institute, National Taiwan University (1996/01~2000/12)
IBM Almaden Research Center, San Jose, California, USA Research Staff Member 1987/06 to 1994/02

Honors and awards
Outstanding Research Award, National Science Council, Taiwan (1999–2005, 2010–2013)
Fellow, Society of Theoretical & Applied Mechanics, Taiwan (November 2012)
Gold Medal Prize, The 26th World Genius Convention (October 2012)
Industry Contribution Award, SEMI Taiwan (2010, 2011, 2012)
2011 International Invention Hall of Fame and Lifetime Achievement Award, Taiwan International Invention Award Winners Association (November 2011)
Chief Editor, International Journal of Automation and Smart Technology (Since March 2011)
Fellow, Chinese Society for Management of Technology, Taiwan (November 2010)
Fellow, Chinese Institute of Automation Engineers, Taiwan (January 2010)
Optical Engineering Award, Taiwan Photonics Society (December 2009)
Flexio, Red Dot Award: Design Concept (2009)
FleXpeaker, The Wall Street Journal 2009 Technology Innovation Award: Consumer Electronics
Excellent Project Award (ITRI Innovative Research Project), 2008 Taiwan Executive Yuan Supervised Project (May 2009)
TECO Science & Technology Award, TECO Technology Foundation, Taiwan (November 2008)
TWAS Prize in Engineering Sciences for 2007 (November 2007)
Excellence Teaching Award, National Taiwan University (2007)
Distinguished Professor, National Taiwan University (Since August 2007)
Editorial Board, The Open Electrical and Electronic Engineering Journal, Bentham Science Publishers (Since March 2007)
Fellow, the American Society of Mechanical Engineers (Since November 2006)
Distinguished Teaching Award, National Taiwan University (2002)
Outstanding Alumni Award, Dept. of Civil Engineering, College of Engineering, National Taiwan University (2002).
First Y.Z. Hsu Scientific Chair Professor (Nano Science Category), Far Eastern Y.Z. Hsu Science and Technology Memorial Foundation (2002).
Fellow, Institute of Physics (FInstP) (December 2001)
Editorial Board, Journal of Smart Materials & Structures, Institute of Physics (Since 2001)
1st Prize, Gold Medal Dragon Thesis Award, Acer Foundation (1999 & 2000)
Excellent Photonic Product Award, Photonics Industry & Technology Development Association & Industrial Development Bureau, Ministry of Economic Affairs, Taiwan (1998 & 2000)
Technology Contribution Award, Optical Engineering Society of the Republic of China (ROCOES) (1997 & 1999)
Outstanding Engineering Professor Award, Chinese Institute of Engineers (1998)
Taiwan Excellent Product Award, Ministry of Economic Affairs, Taiwan (1998)
1998 Circle of Excellence Award, Photonics Spectra, USA (award for AVID, an advanced vibrometer/ interferometer device which was technology transferred to AHEAD Optoelectronics, Inc.)
Award for Significant Contribution to Industry, Ministry of Education, Taiwan (1996, 1998)
IBM Invention Achievement Award (1994)
IBM Outstanding Technical Achievement Award (February 1991)
IBM Research Division Annual Accomplishment List (1990)
IBM Almaden Research Center Annual Accomplishment List (1989)
Jefferson Goblet Award, AIAA (American Institute of Aeronautics and Astronautics) (April 1987)
Taiwan Air Force General Command Award (highest honor for reserve officer) (1983)

References

Taiwanese mechanical engineers
IBM employees
1959 births
Living people
Former United States citizens
Cornell University alumni
Academic staff of the National Taiwan University
National Taiwan University alumni
TWAS laureates